BPJS Kesehatan (Badan Penyelenggara Jaminan Sosial Kesehatan, Social Security Agency of Health) is a social security agency of Indonesia aimed at providing universal health care to its citizens. BPJS Kesehatan is one of two social security agencies in the country alongside .

In January 2014, the Indonesian government launched a universal health care system called the Jaminan Kesehatan Nasional (JKN, "National Health Insurance"). Covering around 250 million people, it is the world's most extensive insurance system. As part of the JKN, on 1 January 2014, PT Askes (Persero) was changed from a state-owned company into BPJS Kesehatan, a public agency, which becomes the provider of JKN. It is expected that the entire population will be covered in 2019.

In 2016, the BPJS program had a deficit of more than six trillion IDR. However, the deficit ballooned to 32 trillion in only three years. In response, the government issued a policy that increases the monthly premium for access by 80% to 100%. Some people saw the move as placing a burden on the low to middle-income citizens.

Every Indonesian citizen and foreigner who has worked in Indonesia for at least six months must become a member of the program in accordance with Article 14 of the BPJS Regulation.

Premiums 
Premiums have three different categories based on the level of service. Premiums are paid monthly and as of May 2020 are the following:

Membership 
1. Workers with Salary
2. Non-Receiving Wage Worker (PBPU) and Non-Workers (BP)
3. Beneficiaries of Health Insurance Contribution Assistance (PBI JK)

Beneficiaries of Health Insurance Contribution Assistance (PBI JK) are Participants who are classified as poor and disadvantaged people whose contributions are paid by the Government. Additionally, they will be automated in class 3.

Recipients of Health Insurance Contribution Assistance must meet the following requirements:

a. Indonesian Citizen
b. Have a registered NIK at Dukcapil
c. Registered in Integrated Social Welfare Data

See also 

 Healthcare in Indonesia

References 

 

Insurance companies of Indonesia
Government agencies of Indonesia
Healthcare in Indonesia